19 teams took part in the league with FC Dynamo Kyiv winning the championship.

League standings

Results

Top scorers
19 goals
 Mikhail Mustygin (Dinamo Minsk)

17 goals
 Oleg Kopayev (SKA Rostov-on-Don)

14 goals
 Eduard Markarov (Neftyanik)

13 goals
 Anatoliy Banishevskiy (Neftyanik)
 Givi Nodia (Dinamo Tbilisi)
 Gennady Yevriuzhikin (Dynamo Moscow)

12 goals
 Yuri Vshivtsev (Dynamo Moscow)

11 goals
 Nikolai Kazaryan (Ararat)

10 goals
 Gennadi Krasnitsky (Pakhtakor)
 Eduard Malofeyev (Dinamo Minsk)
 Demuri Vekua (Torpedo Kutaisi)

References

 Soviet Union - List of final tables (RSSSF)

Soviet Top League seasons
1
Soviet
Soviet